John Alexander Gordon (August 22, 1946 – April 19, 2020) was an American air force general who served as Deputy Director of the Central Intelligence Agency. He also served as the President's Homeland Security advisor from 2003 to 2004.

Military career
Gordon entered the Air Force through the Reserve Officer Training Corps program in 1968. His early assignments were in research, development and acquisition where he was involved in improving the Minuteman Intercontinental Ballistic Missile (ICBM) and in developing and acquiring the Peacekeeper ICBM. He was a long-range planner at Strategic Air Command and served with the U.S. State Department in the Bureau of Politico-Military Affairs. Later, he commanded the 90th Strategic Missile Wing, the only Peacekeeper ICBM unit. He has served with the National Security Council in the areas of defense and arms control, including the oversight and completion of the START II negotiations. He then became a senior member of the secretary of defense's staff and later, the director of operations, Air Force Space Command, responsible for overseeing and developing policy and guidance for the command's operational missions. He also has served as special assistant to the Air Force chief of staff for long-range planning, where he was responsible for restarting and integrating a long-range planning process into the Air Force. Prior to assuming the deputy director position, he was associate director of central intelligence for military support, Central Intelligence Agency. He retired from the Air Force on August 1, 2000.

Post-military career
Following his Air Force retirement, Gordon was chosen as the first administrator of the National Nuclear Security Administration and also Under Secretary of Energy, responsible for the U.S. nuclear weapons program, a position he filled from June 2000 to June 2002.  He next served as the Deputy National Security Advisor for Combating Terrorism, then assumed duties as Homeland Security Advisor from April 2003 to July 2004. On September 16, 2004, he was inducted into the Naval Postgraduate School Hall of Fame. After retiring from public service, he served on the Markle Foundation Task Force on National Security in the Information Age, as well as the board of advisors of VirtualAgility, Inc. (beginning in October 2005), the board of EDO Corporation (beginning in 2007), and the Board of Trustees of Analytic Services, Inc.

Gordon died on April 19, 2020, at the age of 73.

Education
1968 Bachelor of Science degree in physics, with honors, University of Missouri
1970 Master of Science degree in physics, Naval Postgraduate School, Monterey, California
1972 Master of Arts degree in business administration, New Mexico Highlands University, Las Vegas
1975 Squadron Officer School, by correspondence
1978 Air Command and Staff College, by correspondence
1986 Air War College, Maxwell Air Force Base, Alabama

Assignments
July 1968 – June 1970, graduate student, Naval Postgraduate School, Monterey, California, and Wright-Patterson Air Force Base, Ohio
June 1970 – June 1974, physicist, Air Force Weapons Laboratory, Kirtland Air Force Base, New Mexico
June 1974 – April 1976, research associate, Sandia National Laboratories, Albuquerque, New Mexico
April 1976 – February 1979, long-range planner, Headquarters Strategic Air Command, Offutt Air Force Base, Nebraska
February 1979 – August 1980, staff officer, research and development, Headquarters U.S. Air Force, Washington, D.C.
August 1980 – May 1982, executive assistant to the undersecretary of the Air Force, Washington, D.C.
May 1982 – January 1983, deputy director, Office of Policy Analysis, Department of State, Washington, D.C.
January 1983 – July 1985, office director for strategic nuclear policy, and director for defense and arms control matters, Bureau of Politico-Military Affairs, Department of State, Washington, D.C.
July 1985 – July 1986, student, Air War College, Maxwell Air Force Base, Alabama
July 1986 – June 1987, assistant deputy commander for maintenance, 44th Strategic Missile Wing, Ellsworth Air Force Base, South Dakota
June 1987 – May 1989, vice commander, then commander, 90th Strategic Missile Wing, Francis E. Warren Air Force Base, Wyoming
May 1989 – January 1993, special assistant to the president for national security affairs and senior director for defense policy and arms control, National Security Council, Washington, D.C.
January 1993 – June 1994, deputy undersecretary of defense and chief of staff for policy, Department of Defense, Washington, D.C.
June 1994 – September 1995, director of operations, Headquarters Air Force Space Command, Peterson Air Force Base, Colorado
September 1995 – September 1996, special assistant to the chief of staff for long-range planning, Headquarters U.S. Air Force, Washington, D.C.
September 1996 – October 1997, associate director of central intelligence for military support, Central Intelligence Agency, Washington, D.C.
October 1997 – 2000, deputy director of central intelligence, Central Intelligence Agency, Washington, D.C.

Major awards and decorations
  Defense Distinguished Service Medal with oak leaf cluster
  Defense Superior Service Medal
  Legion of Merit
  Defense Meritorious Service Medal
  Meritorious Service Medal with oak leaf cluster
  Air Force Commendation Medal

Effective dates of promotion
Second Lieutenant June 4, 1968
First Lieutenant December 4, 1969
Captain June 4, 1971
Major September 1, 1979
Lieutenant Colonel November 1, 1981
Colonel December 1, 1985
Brigadier General June 1, 1992
Major General May 25, 1995
Lieutenant General September 20, 1996
General October 31, 1997

References

|-

|-

1946 births
2020 deaths
Deputy Directors of the Central Intelligence Agency
Military personnel from Missouri
Naval Postgraduate School alumni
New Mexico Highlands University alumni
People from Jefferson City, Missouri
Recipients of the Defense Distinguished Service Medal
Recipients of the Defense Superior Service Medal
Recipients of the Legion of Merit
United States Air Force generals
University of Missouri alumni
Physicists from Missouri
United States Department of Energy officials
Assistants to the President of the United States
People from Columbia, Missouri